Sofiane Labidi (born 29 September 1977 in Béja) is a Tunisian sprinter who specialises in the 400 metres. He achieved his personal best time of 45.19 seconds in Seville in June 2004. He represented his country at the 2000 and 2004 Summer Olympic Games.

He missed the 1997 season due to injury, then missed 1998 due to a hepatitis b infection.

He was the coach of the Tunisian national sprint and hurdles team from 2011 to 2013.

International competitions

External links

1977 births
Living people
People from Béja
Tunisian male sprinters
Olympic athletes of Tunisia
Athletes (track and field) at the 2000 Summer Olympics
Athletes (track and field) at the 2004 Summer Olympics
African Games bronze medalists for Tunisia
African Games medalists in athletics (track and field)
Mediterranean Games gold medalists for Tunisia
Mediterranean Games silver medalists for Tunisia
Mediterranean Games medalists in athletics
Athletes (track and field) at the 2003 All-Africa Games
Athletes (track and field) at the 2001 Mediterranean Games
Athletes (track and field) at the 2005 Mediterranean Games
20th-century Tunisian people
21st-century Tunisian people